The 2009–10 ICC Intercontinental Cup was the fifth edition of the ICC Intercontinental Cup tournament, an international first-class cricket competition between nations who had not been awarded Test status by the International Cricket Council. The first fixtures were played in July 2009. The format was changed since the previous edition, with a two division system being introduced. The 2009 ICC World Cup Qualifier also served as a qualifier for this tournament. The top six teams from the qualifier, along with a Zimbabwe XI, would compete in a round robin top division. The teams ranked 7th–10th in the competition would contest the ICC Intercontinental Shield.

Table

Win – 14 points
Draw if more than 10 hours of play lost – 7 points (otherwise 3 points)
First Innings leader – 6 points (independent of final result)
Abandoned without a ball played – 10 points.

Matches

2009 season

2009–10 season

2010 season

2010–11 season

Final

Summary

2009 season
The tournament began in July when Scotland beat Canada in Aberdeen, inside three days. Kenya then drew with Ireland in Eglinton. Paul Stirling scored his first century in the first innings. In the third match Daan van Bunge scored 98 not for the Netherlands in the draw with Canada in Rotterdam. In August Kenya visited Canada in King City. Steve Tikolo had a brilliant performance, scoring two centuries in the match for a total of 326 runs, with Kenya winning the game by 247 runs. Afghanistan made their debut in first class cricket, visiting Mutare to play the Zimbabwe XI. Noor Ali scored two centuries in this match (230 runs), securing the draw. Tatenda Taibu also scored two centuries for 279 runs. In a match reduced by rain on the final day, Scotland and Ireland played out a draw in Aberdeen. Qasim Sheikh and William Porterfield made centuries, but Regan West took seven Scottish wickets for 88 runs in Scotland's 2nd innings. In Amstelveen, Afghanistan secured their first win, beating the Netherlands by one wicket. Afghanistan's ninth 2nd Innings wicket fell with only six runs needed for victory; Samiullah Shenwari scored the winning runs with a four for the first victory for Afghanistan in first class cricket.

2009-10 season
Zimbabwe XI defeated Kenya with a notable performance of Vusi Sibanda, who scored 209 and 116*. Afghanistan scored their second win versus Ireland in Dambulla. Scotland made the target to obtain the win versus Kenya. Dewald Nel took 5 wickets, included to Morris Ouma, who scored 106 runs in the second inning. In February Afghanistan in Sharjah won on third occasion in the Intercontinental Cup by defeating Canada, with an amazing second innings of 494 runs. This was the ninth highest fourth-innings run chase in first-class cricket. Mohammad Shahzad contributed to the victory with 214 runs. The same day Kenya made a run chase of 320 runs versus Netherlands.

Statistics and records
Statistics and records for the 2009–10 Intercontinental Cup.

Most runs

Most wickets

References

ICC Intercontinental Cup
Intercontinental Cup
Intercontinental Cup
Intercontinental Cup
Intercontinental Cup
Intercontinental Cup
2009–10 Zimbabwean cricket season